The Ogre Gods is a French black & white comic series in four volumes written by Hubert, with illustrations from Bertrand Gatignol. The first volume, Petit, was published by Soleil Productions in 2014.

Synopsis

First volume: Petit 
Over a wide valley reign the Giants: immense, human flesh eaters, who live in a gigantic palace; served by thousands of humans. Their cruel and violent king is the powerful Gabaal, and his wife the Queen Émione. One day, the queen gives birth to a son she did not even know she was carrying. The child so small that he looks human to the eyes of his gigantic relatives. The royal family has indeed been degenerating for a long time, with centuries of inbreeding visible in the size and longevity of each newborn, who dies younger and is smaller than his predecessors. The queen, knowledgeable and literate, sees in her child the hope for the race of giants, because he could mate with human women—as did the Founder, the mythical sovereign who founded their kingdom and was the progenitor of the clan of giants. 

In the past, the queen had already gave birth to triplets, who were also smaller than their parents. For the king, this is too much. He is ashamed of his new son, and wants him to disappear. The queen decides to hide this fourth child from her husband. The son will be called "Petit", after the old Princess Desdée, aunt of the king, excluded from the family because of her love for humans. Desdée always refused to feed on their flesh, opposing the "God-King"'s tradition. "God-King", her great-great-grandfather, lived to be exceptionally old. He was the greatest of all his lineage. Although being raised by his aunt and following a human education, Petit is torn by the violent impulses inherited from his ancestors and from a family that constantly threatens him.

This volume makes several references to the "Book of the Forebears", introducing the following characters: Princess Desdea, the Founder, Queen Emione, the God-King, Prince Coor and King Eliabaal.

Second volume: Half-Blood 
The second volume of the story, entitled "Half-Blood", tells a parallel story to that of Petit, but starts well before and takes the form of a series of flashbacks. We follow the story of Yori Draken, Chamberlain of King Gabaal who appeared anonymously in the first volume. This new book provides a better understanding of the kingdom of the Giants: the real political power is held there by the descendants of five great families called the "noble-born", these are the Draken, the Elissen, the Hunrahi, the Ragnar, and the Zigness. These five families are descended from five captains of the Founder of the line of Giants, and form the heart of human nobility, standing above the other inhabitants of the kingdom. All government positions are occupied by nobles-born who elect, from among themselves, the Chamberlain, the official who since the time of the "God-King" is the most powerful man in the kingdom, just below the Giants. Young Yori is a bastard son of the head of the Elissen family and a former courtesan. Raised for a time in the Elissen palace with his father's legitimate children, the young Yori must leave him with his mother following an altercation with his half-brothers. Resentful and ambitious, he desires after this humiliation to reach the highest rank of human power in the kingdom, to take revenge on the noble-born families who despise him because of his "half-blood" status.

Similar the first volume, this new volume is sprinkled with references from the "Book of Chamberlains" and presents characters quoted in the story: Malkus Elissen, Kiril Ragnar, Jubal Elissen, Eri Zigness, Mihal Tamas, and Yori Draken.

Third volume: The Great Man 
This third opus offers a new story, that of Lours, aka "The Great Man". The story begins chronologically after the end of Petit.

So we find Petit, and his beloved Sala, where we left them at the end of the first novel—on the stairs leading to the royal palace. As the two lovers flee, Chamberlain Yori Draken, determined to put Petit, the last heir of his race, on the throne in order to restore order, sends his men after them, led by Sol, his fearsome damned soul.

Fallen into a trap, Sala is captured. Petit, seriously injured, is then fostered and cared for by a mysterious man called Lours, an itinerant cutler and grinder. The latter turns out to be at the head of the “Levelers”, a group of resistance fighters. Aware that Gabaal's son has nothing in common with his father, Lours sees in him a major asset against the Chamberlain. In exchange for their help in freeing Sala, Petit must claim his throne, disavow the Chamberlain, and restore harmony between the giants and the humans.

But the road will be long until the end of the journey...

As for previous albums, the graphic style of the title foreshadowed the atmosphere that would accompany us over the pages. This new volume is no exception, and the use of characters, reminiscent of Scandinavian runes, leads us this time into a world where Gothic aesthetics gives way to the harshness of Nordic landscapes where forests have eyes and hide forgotten entities. In short, the author continues to develop a fascinating universe, with new creatures, new people, and a new language.

After Petit and Yori Draken, this album focuses on the character of Lours. His troubled past is essentially mentioned in the texts interspersing the drawn chapters. We thus learn that he is the link that binds historical facts unique to the universe of the Ogre-Gods. Fine strategist, but above all a wounded man and a tragic figure, Lours brings real greatness to the story and gives the title of this opus all its meaning.

Fourth volume: First Born 
In this fourth opus, the story turns back the clock into the past of the kingdom of the giants, talking about the life of Bragante, the first child of the Founder who killed her mother when she came into the world. Educated by her Aunt Nita, her mother's sister, she becomes an avid scholar, as well as the surrogate mother of her half-siblings. But she also has a strong temperament that makes her speak out against the authority of her father, the Founder, who does not appreciate her educating the rest of his siblings, the latter preferring that his sons become warriors and his daughters into reproductive ones in the hope that his family will avenge him one day by returning in his homeland.

This volume is sprinkled with references to the history of the kingdom of the giants through that of important characters:

- Nita, the sister of Bragante's mother, Aramande of Rieviell, who was hired by the first-born to help her fill the library of the castle of the giants

- Elvir Elissen, the first of the five captains under the orders of the Founder who will create the families of the Noble-born (and therefore one of the ancestors of Yori Draken, the Chamberlain at the time of Petit)

- Tovar, the master-architect of the Firstborn, who, in addition to designing his library, was also one of the first architects working on the constant expansion of the Castle of the Giants while creating passages allowing human servants to avoid their gigantic lords

- and finally, the giantess whom her mother nicknamed "Book Eater", who was none other than the future Queen Émione, the last of the scholars of the Giant family and mother of Petit.

List of volumes 

.

 Half-Blood, 2016
 The Great Man, 2018
 First-born, 2020

Work genesis 
The imposing size of the series wasn't anticipated at the beginning of the project, but imposed itself over the course of its conception. The series is designed as an independent work and a sequel, if considered, is not planned for now.

According to Hubert, the whole story came to him during "a long night of insomnia", which allowed Bertrand Gatignol to get involved very early in the project, through the writing process and structure of the story.

Analysis 
The album alternates comic and story sections, following the fairy tale model. This allows the author, according to BoDoï, to "carefully lead the immersion of the reader in the bewitching, cruel and fatal universe that it builds page after page”.

interview

References

French comic strips